John Lyle may refer to:
John Lyle (assemblyman), Wisconsin State Assemblyman
John E. Lyle, Jr. (1910–2003), U.S. Representative from Texas
John M. Lyle (1872–1945), Canadian architect
John Percival Lyle (1878–1968), politician in Saskatchewan, Canada
John Lyle (pilot), U.S. Army Air Force Officer, fighter pilot with the Tuskegee Airmen
John T. Lyle, professor of landscape architecture at Cal Poly Pomona

See also
John Lyall, footballer